William Smith "Big Chief" Bonner was a college football player and engineer.

Auburn University
Bonner was a prominent guard for Mike Donahue's Auburn Tigers of Auburn University.

1911
Bonner was captain and All-Southern in 1911. The 1911 team went 4–0–1 in conference play.

Mobile
He worked as an engineer in Mobile, Alabama.

References

American football guards
All-Southern college football players
Auburn Tigers football players
Year of birth missing